Vallecillo, meaning little valley in Spanish, can refer to:

People:
Érick Vallecillo (born 1980), Honduran footballer
Orlin Vallecillo (born 1983), Honduran footballer

Places:
Vallecillo, Honduras, town in Honduras
Vallecillo Municipality, Nuevo León, town in Nuevo León, Mexico
Vallecillo, León, town in the province of León, Castile y León, Spain
El Vallecillo, town in the province of Teruel, Aragón, Spain